Mapping an Invisible World is a studio album by American indie rock band Days Away. It was released in 2005 on Fueled by Ramen and produced by Neal Avron.

Track listing 
(all songs written by Days Away)

God and Mars - 2:45
Stay the Same - 3:40
Gravity - 3:28
Ideas - 3:48
Keep Your Voices Down - 3:38
Mirrors - 3:56
It's Not Over - 3:50
The Fight - 3:29
You Were Right - 3:41
It Happens - 3:15
T. Kline's Decline - 6:26

Personnel 

Keith Goodwin – Vocals, guitar
Matt Austin – Guitar
Chris Frangicetto – Bass
Tim Arnold – Drums
Bryan Gulla – Keyboard

References

Days Away albums
2005 albums
Fueled by Ramen albums
Albums produced by Neal Avron